Stignano is a comune (municipality) in the Province of Reggio Calabria in the Italian region Calabria, located about  south of Catanzaro and about  northeast of Reggio Calabria. Stignano borders the following municipalities: Camini, Caulonia, Pazzano, Placanica, Riace, Stilo.

References

Cities and towns in Calabria